Ultra Violet and I Found Love are two titles given to the seventh studio album released by English group Bananarama in 1995. Originally released in Japan only, with the title I Found Love, the album was renamed and repackaged as Ultra Violet in other countries, including the United States, Australia, Canada, and continental Europe, where it was marketed either at the same time or in the following years. Neither Ultra Violet nor I Found Love was released in the United Kingdom, where the band had not had any hits since their 1993 cover of "More, More, More" (and would not again until 2005 with the single "Move in My Direction").

The album was released on various labels, including ZYX Records and DigIt International, depending upon the different countries because Bananarama had no major record deal after leaving London Records, which had released all of their works before 1993. Musically, the 1995 album continued Bananarama's Europop sound, and it was a success commercially. Its biggest success came from the album's first single, "Every Shade of Blue", which sold well enough in Canada to chart in the Top 40. It also peaked at #124 in Australia. Two more singles were taken from the two editions: the title track, "I Found Love", and "Take Me to Your Heart", which was heavily remixed for the single version, turning it from a rhythm guitar-based, almost acoustic tune into a Europop number, much like the other album tracks.  "Take Me To Your Heart" peaked at #180 in Australia.

The album was released for the first time in the United Kingdom on 7 August 2020, and was also available on vinyl for the first time.

The album peaked at #201 on the Australian ARIA albums chart.

Track listing
Ultra Violet CD and cassette version
"Every Shade of Blue" – 4:01 (S. Dallin, G. Miller, S. Torch, K. Woodward, P. Barry)
"Rhythm of Life" – 3:59 (S. Dallin, G. Miller, P. Barry, S. Torch, K. Woodward)
"Take Me to Your Heart" – 4:00 (S. Dallin, G. Miller, P. Barry, S. Torch, K. Woodward)
"Prove Your Love" – 3:56 (S. Dallin, G. Miller, P. Barry, S. Torch, K. Woodward)
"Take Me Away" – 3:56 (S. Dallin, G. Miller, P. Barry, S. Torch, K. Woodward)
"System" – 3:58 (S. Dallin, G. Miller, S. Torch, K. Woodward)
"Maybe the Next Time" – 4:02 (S. Dallin, G. Miller, P. Barry, S. Torch, K. Woodward)
"You've Really Got Something" – 3:37 (S. Dallin, G. Miller, P. Barry, S. Torch, K. Woodward)
"Time Out" – 3:56 (S. Dallin, G. Miller, P. Barry, S. Torch, K. Woodward)
"Don't Stop Me Now" – 4:24 (S. Dallin, G. Miller, P. Barry, K. Woodward)
"Give In to Me" – 3:48 (S. Dallin, G. Miller, P. Barry, K. Woodward)
"I Found Love" (bonus track) – 4:24 (S. Dallin, T. Komuro, K. Woodward)

''I Found Love'' CD and cassette version
"I Found Love" (ROZI-Mix)
"Every Shade of Blue" – 4:01
"Rhythm of Life" – 3:59
"Take Me to Your Heart" – 4:00
"Prove Your Love" – 3:56
"Take Me Away" – 3:56
"System" – 3:58
"Maybe the Next Time" – 4:02
"You've Really Got Something" – 3:37
"Time Out" – 3:56
"Don't Stop Me Now" – 4:24
"Give in to Me" – 3:48
"I Found Love" (Original Version) – 4:24

Unreleased songs and demos
"Prove Your Love" (Harwood Heights Mix) Available on US ITunes.
"Prove Your Love" (Harwood Heights Edit)Available on US ITunes.
"Do What You Wanna Do"
"Garden of Eden"

Personnel
Bananarama
Sara Dallin – Vocals
Keren Woodward – Vocals

Musicians
Gary Miller – Programming

Additional personnel
Peter Barrett – Sleeve design
Andrew Biscomb – Sleeve design
Kate Garner – Photography
Gary Miller – Producer
Gary Miller, Paul Barry and Steve Torch – Co-songwriters
Tetsuya Komuro – Co-songwriter on "I Found Love"

References

1995 albums
Bananarama albums
ZYX Music albums